Lee–Miles is a historical area on the Southeast side of Cleveland, Ohio, comprising the two neighborhoods of Lee–Harvard and Lee–Seville. Once an independent municipality known as Miles Heights, it was annexed by Cleveland after a referendum in 1932. Today, it most corresponds to Cleveland's Ward 1.

A mostly middle-class African American neighborhood, Lee–Miles is bordered by the suburban cities of Shaker Heights to the north, Warrensville Heights to the east, Maple Heights to the south, Garfield Heights to the southwest and Cleveland's Union–Miles Park neighborhood to the northwest.

Parks and recreations
Kerruish Park (located along the Mill Creek) 
Frederick Douglass Park
Lee–Harvard Community Service Center
John F. Kennedy Recreational Center

Education
John F. Kennedy high school 
 Whitney M. Young
Charles W. Eliot School 
 Citizens Academy Southwest
Invictus High school 
Archbishop Lyke Campus 
 Harvard Avenue Community School
 Ceogc Preschool
 Adlai Stevenson
 Charles W. Eliot School

Others
Lee–Harvard Shopping Plaza
Cleveland Industrial Park – this community's largest development site. At 114 acres, this industrial park is located near I-480 with interchanges at Lee Road and Broadway Avenue, and was created by city government in 1981. Since 1998, the city has marketed opportunities for new business and successfully secured several industries who made commitments to create 600 new jobs in the $40 million industrial development.
Cleveland Fire Station #17
MetroHealth Medical Center Lee–Harvard Hospital
Cleveland Public Library – Lee–Harvard Branch

References

Further reading

External links
 Todd Michney, Lee–Harvard Neighborhood, The Encyclopedia of Cleveland History, Case Western Reserve University
 Todd Michney, Lee–Seville Neighborhood, The Encyclopedia of Cleveland History, Case Western Reserve University

Neighborhoods in Cleveland